Following the 2022 Russian invasion of Ukraine, more than 300,000 Russian citizens and residents are estimated to have left Russia by mid-March 2022, at least 500,000 by the end of August 2022, and an additional 400,000 by early October, for a total of approximately 900,000. This number includes economic migrants, conscientious objectors, and some political refugees.

Reasons for exodus

There have been at least three waves of Russian emigration.

First wave
In the first wave, immediately after Russia invaded Ukraine, journalists, politicians, and tech workers fled. Many sought to evade criminal prosecution for exercising free speech regarding the invasion. In March, President Vladimir Putin introduced prison sentences of up to 15 years for publishing "fake news" about Russian military operations. More than 2,000 people were charged by May 2022 under the laws prohibiting "fake" information about the military. Nina Belyayeva, a Communist Party deputy in the Voronezh Oblast Legislative Assembly, stated that she fled Russia due to threats of criminal prosecution and imprisonment for having spoken against the invasion, saying, "I realized that it was better to leave now. Once a criminal case is opened, it could be too late." Journalist Boris Grozovski stated that "We are refugees. Personally, I was wanted by the police in Russia for distributing anti-war petitions... We ran not from bullets, bombs and missiles, but from prison. If I wrote what I write now while in Russia, I would inevitably go to prison for 15–20 years." Actress Chulpan Khamatova stayed in exile in Latvia after she signed a petition against the war in Ukraine. She stated: "it was made clear to me it would be undesirable for me to go back," adding "I know I am not a traitor. I love my motherland very much." Bolshoi Ballet dancer Olga Smirnova left Russia to continue her career in the Netherlands in protest of the war. As for tech workers, for many it was made clear that they would have to leave Russia as a condition of employment; in any case, many tech workers can work remotely. According to a Russian IT industry trade group, approximately 50,000-70,000 IT workers fled in the invasion's first month.

Among the Russians who left Russia after the invasion of Ukraine were pop legend Alla Pugacheva and comedian Maxim Galkin, television journalist Alexander Nevzorov, diplomat Boris Bondarev, politician and economist Anatoly Chubais, businessman Oleg Tinkov, and rapper Oxxxymiron.

Second wave

A second wave became apparent by July 2022, and this wave consisted more generally of middle and upper class people and parents who had required longer to prepare to emigrate, for example; people with businesses or people who had to wait for their children's school year to end.

In June, it was expected that around 15,000 millionaires would leave Russia in 2022.

Third wave

Following Putin's announcement of partial mobilization on 21 September, a third wave of Russian emigration began, with estimates of hundreds of thousands of male citizens fleeing. In the first week after the announcement, 98,000 Russians fled to Kazakhstan. On 24 September alone over 8,500 Russians entered Finland by land, a 62% increase on the previous Saturday.

In this third wave alone, nearly 300,000 Russian citizens had left Russia before 27 September, with that number approaching 400,000 by 4 October. An upper estimate is for 700,000 Russians to have fled conscription since it was announced. Many went to Kazakhstan, Serbia, Turkey, the United Arab Emirates, Georgia, and Finland.

Putin signed a decree introducing prison terms of up to 15 years for wartime acts, including voluntary surrender and desertion during mobilization or war.

Actor Artur Smolyaninov fled Russia in October 2022. He was charged for "discrediting" the military under the "fake news" laws, for making anti-war statements after he had left Russia.

Destinations
Among the destinations chosen by Russian nationals are Turkey, with more than 100,000 Russians seeking residence, many using Turkish Airlines to fly to Antalya. Georgia and Armenia also received large numbers. By early April, an estimated 100,000 Russians had fled to Georgia and 50,000 went to Armenia. In 2022, 104,000 Russian citizens have registered their stay in Serbia.

In Latin America, Argentina received by January 2023 more than 5,000 pregnant Russian women, who chose to have their children there, due to the ease of obtaining visa, the automatic obtaining of nationality for the newborn and free healthcare.

Other major destinations include Azerbaijan, the United Arab Emirates, Greece, Bulgaria, Romania, Kazakhstan, Kyrgyzstan, Uzbekistan, Spain, Israel, Tajikistan, Mongolia, Latin American countries, the Baltic states, and the United States.

As the majority of European countries closed their airspace to Russian flights following the invasion, Russians seeking to leave the country have often had to take detours through the Caucasus or have had to find overland routes. On 25 March, the high-speed railway between Saint Petersburg and Helsinki was suspended by Finnish state railway operator VR, closing the last direct train route between Russia and the European Union. The route had previously been a significant passage out of Russia for Russian citizens, particularly those who already had work or residence connections to Finland, as a valid visa and EU-recognised COVID-19 vaccine certification was required by the Russian government for passengers.

Several EU countries, such as Latvia and the Czech Republic, have suspended granting visas to Russian citizens, complicating their exit from Russia. Some countries have allowed temporary stays without a visa. Turkey, for example, has allowed Russian citizens without visas to stay for up to two months. However, Finland, Poland and the Baltic countries of Latvia, Lithuania and Estonia announced they will not offer refuge to Russians fleeing mobilization. In contrast, Germany offered asylum to Russian oppositionists and conscripts who did not want to go to war with Ukraine.

Two Russian nationals claimed asylum in the United States after sailing in a small boat to Alaska.

At least five yachts carrying Russian nationals have attempted to enter a number of South Korean ports, but only two Russian passengers were allowed entry.

Most hotel rooms and Airbnbs in Kazakhstan were sold out to Russian immigrants within days.

Difficulties faced by emigrants
Amnesty International noted that many Russian political emigrants, who entered the European Union on Schengen visas, become illegal immigrants after 90 days because they do not want to submit an applications for asylum due to impossibility to continue their activities as journalists, human rights activists, etc., in such case. In addition, many Russian oppositionists and representatives of civil society, who are in Russia or who had migrated to other non-safe countries from Russia (for example, to CIS-countries), do not have Schengen visas and have difficulties in obtaining them. In this regard, on 25 May 2022, Amnesty International encouraged the Cabinet of Germany to expand the programme of humanitarian admission on Russians persecuted by Putin's regime. This programme should include humanitarian visas issuance and granting of temporary residence and work permits.

Impact
Those who have fled tend to be young and well-educated professionals, leading some economists to suggest that the Russian brain drain is worsening. More than 50,000 Russian information technology specialists have left Russia.

Reactions

Georgia
Since the outbreak of the war in Ukraine, approximately 200,000 Russian citizens entered Georgia from Russia, of which 60,000 had remained in the country while others had crossed into Turkey and Armenia. The peak of migration came at the period of mobilization in Russia.

The migration has reportedly helped the Georgian economy to grow faster and the Georgian lari to steadily get stronger. However, the arrival of Russians has also reportedly made real estate prices skyrocket in Tbilisi; in November 2022, average real estate prices were 210% higher than 1 year prior. An important factor in this is that Russian migrants, often wealthy, are ready to pay much higher sums than Georgians for apartments. This has rendered rent unaffordable for some Georgian locals, exacerbating pre-existing tensions between Russians and Georgians caused by the recent Russo-Georgian War and the fact that 20% of Georgian territory is occupied by Russia.

Other causes of tension are cases of Russian migrants behaving aggressively, demanding to be served in Russian, to be allowed to pay in Russian ruble, etc.
Screenshots of alleged Russian users (from a large Telegram group of people crossing the Russo-Georgian border) complaining they were not allowed entry into Georgia because of Z signs on their cars went viral on the Georgian and Ukrainian internet.

In October 2022, small-scale protests were held demanding the introduction of a visa regime with Russia, with the ruling Georgian Dream party dismissing such a step as "irrational".

The FSB has sent agents to infiltrate Georgia amidst the immigration wave. Once exposed, the news "barely makes a ripple" in Georgia's media.

Israel
Despite expecting mostly Jewish refugees from Ukraine, Israel has seen more arrivals from Russia. While Israel relaxed the "Law of Return" for Ukrainian emigrants, it did not extend that measure to Russian emigrants, who have instead obtained tourist visas while starting the citizenship application process.

Kazakhstan
Kazakhstani president Kassym-Jomart Tokayev said that Kazakhstan would help fleeing Russians, saying that "most of them are forced to leave because of the current hopeless situation."

In December 2022, Kazakhstan reportedly deported a Russian citizen, a former presidential guard, who fled mobilization; Kazakhstan denied his asylum claim in late November while human rights activists have said that the country's law on refugees allows him to stay in Kazakhstan while his lawyers appeal.

Russia
On 16 March, President Vladimir Putin issued a warning to Russian "traitors", claiming that the West "wanted to use them as a fifth column" and that Russians would always be able to "distinguish the true patriots from the scum and the traitors". While some experts said Putin's ire was directed toward what he perceived to be wavering loyalty among Russian elites, and in particular, Russian oligarchs, statements from Kremlin officials have also broadly labeled those who fled as "traitors", as spokesman Dmitry Peskov affirmed the following day to Reuters:"In such difficult times…Many people show their true colors…They vanish from our lives themselves. Some people are leaving their posts. Some are leaving their active work life. Some leave the country and move to other countries. That is how this cleansing happens."

Ukraine
On 23 March, Ukrainian president Volodymyr Zelenskyy called on Russians to emigrate from Russia so as not to finance the war in Ukraine with their taxes. In August, he called on Western countries to ban all Russian citizens from entering, including those opposed to the war, stating that Russians should "live in their own world until they change their philosophy".

United States

While the United States has received Russian applications for asylum since the start of the invasion, it has warned against the increased trend of unauthorized entry: in one example, a maritime incursion by Russian nationals on a charter boat in Key West, Florida was initially characterized by the Department of Homeland Security as a "national security event", with the intercepted migrants subsequently scheduled to be deported.

On 27 September 2022, White House press secretary Karine Jean-Pierre encouraged Russian men fleeing their home country to avoid being drafted to apply for asylum in the United States.

See also
 
 
 
 
 
 
 
 
 Fourth-wave Russian emigration
 List of Soviet and Eastern Bloc defectors

References

Brain drain
Russian emigrants
Russian exiles
Russian refugees
Politically motivated migrations
Reactions to the 2022 Russian invasion of Ukraine
2022 in Russia
Opposition to Vladimir Putin
Anti-war movement
Conscription in Russia
Russian activists against the 2022 Russian invasion of Ukraine
 
 
 
 
 
 
 
 
 
Contemporary migrations
Migrant crises